The 2014 GT Sprint Series (known for sponsorship reasons as the 2014 Blancpain Sprint Series) was the second season following on from the demise of the SRO Group's FIA GT1 World Championship (an auto racing series for grand tourer cars), the first with the designation of Blancpain Sprint Series.

Calendar
The series began at the Circuit Paul Armagnac in Nogaro, France on 21 April and ended at Baku World Challenge in Azerbaijan on 2 November. The seven-event calendar contained largely the same events as FIA GT Series, with the addition of races at Brands Hatch in the Great Britain and Algarve in Portugal, and the pullout of Circuito de Navarra, Spain.

Entry list

Race results

Championship standings
Scoring system
Championship points were awarded for the first six positions in each Qualifying Race and for the first ten positions in each Championship Race. The pole-sitter in the qualifying race also received one point, entries were required to complete 75% of the winning car's race distance in order to be classified and earn points. Individual drivers were required to participate for a minimum of 25 minutes in order to earn championship points in any race.

Qualifying race points

Championship race points

Drivers' Championship

Cup

Pro-Am Trophy

Silver Cup

Teams' Championship

Cup

Pro-Am Trophy

Silver Cup

See also
2014 Blancpain GT Series
2014 Blancpain Endurance Series

Footnotes

References

External links

Blancpain Sprint Series